Sweet Dreams is a 1973 novel by Michael Frayn. The book follows a middle-class intellectual man who dies and ends up in a middle-class intellectual version of heaven, where he and his circle of middle-class intellectual friends have jobs such as designing the Alps and creating man.  Howard moves through a series of more or less trite philosophical positions before finally going to work for God.

1973 British novels
1973 fantasy novels
Novels by Michael Frayn
Novels set in heaven